The 1973 Baylor Bears football team represented the Baylor University in the 1973 NCAA Division I football season.  The Bears finished in eighth place in the Southwestern Conference.

Schedule

Personnel

References

Baylor
Baylor Bears football seasons
Baylor Bears football